Naegleria fowleri, colloquially known as a "brain-eating amoeba", is a species of the genus Naegleria, belonging to the phylum Percolozoa, which is technically not classified as a true amoeba, but a shapeshifting amoeboflagellate excavate. It is a free-living, bacteria-eating microorganism that can be pathogenic, causing an extremely rare, sudden, severe, and usually fatal brain infection called naegleriasis or primary amoebic meningoencephalitis (PAM). This microorganism is typically found in bodies of warm freshwater, such as ponds, lakes, rivers, hot springs, warm water discharge from industrial or power plants, geothermal well water, poorly maintained or minimally chlorinated (under 0.5 mg/m3 residual) swimming pools, water heaters, soil, and pipes connected to tap water. It can be seen in either an amoeboid or temporary flagellate stage.

Etymology 
The organism was named after Malcolm Fowler, an Australian pathologist at Adelaide Children's Hospital, who was the first author of the original series of case reports of primary amoebic meningoencephalitis.

Life cycle 

Naegleria fowleri is a thermophilic, free-living amoeba. It is found in warm and hot freshwater ponds, lakes, and rivers, and in the very warm water of hot springs. As the temperature rises in waters where it is present, its numbers increase. The amoeba was identified first in the 1960s in Australia, but it appears to have evolved in the United States. N. fowleri occurs in three forms – as a cyst, a trophozoite (ameboid), and a biflagellate. It does not form a cyst in solid human tissue, where only the amoeboid trophozoite stage exists; however, the flagellate form has been found in cerebrospinal fluid.

Cyst stage 
Trophozoites change to cyst form to survive times when the environment is temporarily harsh. The cyst is a spherical, single-layered, smooth wall about 7–15 µm in diameter, that encloses a single nucleus.

The cyst is a resilient, life-preserving capsule for the amoeba, that resists adverse conditions. Factors that induce cyst formation include a lack of food, overcrowding, desiccation, accumulation of waste products, and cold temperatures. When conditions improve, the amoeba can escape through the pore, or ostiole, seen in the middle of the cyst. N. fowleri has been found to encyst at temperatures below .

Trophozoite stage 
The trophozoite is the infective stage for humans, when the organism can actively feed and divide. The trophozoite attaches to the olfactory epithelium, where it follows the olfactory cell axon through the cribriform plate (in the nasal cavity) to the brain. This reproductive stage of the protozoan organism, which transforms near 25 °C (77 °F) and grows best at approximately 42 °C (106.7 °F), proliferates by binary fission.

The trophozoites are characterized by a nucleus and a surrounding flexible membrane. They travel by pseudopodia, which means that they extend parts of their body's cell membrane (the pseudopods) and then fill them with protoplasm to force locomotion. The pseudopods form at different points along the cell, thus allowing the trophozoite to change directions. In their free-living state, trophozoites feed on bacteria. In tissues, it appears they phagocytize (consume by enclosing and then digesting prey) red blood cells and destroy tissue either by releasing cytolytic substances or by cell-to-cell contact using cytolytic membrane proteins.

As a trophozoite, Naegleria fowleri may grow roughly 1 to 12 structures on their membrane called amoebastomes (an amorphous cytostome), also called "suckers" or "food cups", which they use to feed in a manner similar to trogocytosis.

Flagellate 
The flagellate is pear-shaped and biflagellate: this means that it has two flagella. This stage can be inhaled into the nasal cavity during swimming or diving. This biflagellate form occurs when trophozoites are exposed to a change in ionic concentration, such as placement in distilled water. The flagellate form does not exist in human tissue, but can exist in the cerebrospinal fluid. Once inside the nasal cavity, the flagellated form transforms into a trophozoite. The transformation of flagellate to trophozoite occurs within a few hours.

Ecology 
Naegleria fowleri are excavates that inhabit soil and water. N. fowleri is sensitive to drying and acid. It cannot survive in sea water. This amoeba is able to grow best at moderately elevated temperatures making summer month infections more likely. Warm, fresh water with a sufficient supply of bacterial food provides a habitat for amoebae. Artificial bodies of water, disturbed natural habitats, or areas with soil and unchlorinated or unfiltered water are locations where many amoebic infections have occurred.

N. fowleri seems to thrive during periods of disturbance; the flagellate-empty hypothesis explains that Naegleria's success may be due to decreased competition from a depleted population of the normal, thermosensitive protozoal fauna. In other words, N. fowleri thrives in the absence of other predators consuming its food supply. This hypothesis suggests that human disturbances such as thermal pollution increase N. fowleri abundance by removing their resource competitors. Ameoboflagellates have a motile flagellate stage that is evolved for dispersal, which is advantageous when an environment has been cleared of competing organisms.

Pathogenicity 

N. fowleri may cause an often fatal infection of the brain called naegleriasis (also known as primary amoebic meningoencephalitis, amoebic encephalitis/meningitis, or simply Naegleria infection). Infections most often occur when water containing N. fowleri is inhaled through the nose (aspirated), where it then enters the nasal and olfactory nerve tissue, travelling to the brain through the cribriform plate. N. fowleri cannot cause infection by swallowing contaminated water. Infections typically occur after swimming in warm-climate freshwater, although there have been cases in cooler climates such as Minnesota, US. In rare cases, infection has been caused by nasal or sinus rinsing with contaminated water in a nasal rinsing device such as a neti pot.

N. fowleri normally eat bacteria, but during human infections, the trophozoites consume astrocytes and neurons. The reason why N. fowleri passes across the cribriform plate has remained unknown, but the neurotransmitter acetylcholine has been suggested as a stimulus precipitating the action, as a structural homolog of animal CHRM1 has been shown to be present in Naegleria and Acanthamoeba.

It takes one to nine days (average five) for symptoms to appear after nasal exposure to N. fowleri flagellates. Symptoms may include headache, fever, nausea, vomiting, loss of appetite, altered mental state, coma, drooping eyelid, blurred vision, and loss of the sense of taste. Later symptoms may include stiff neck, confusion, lack of attention, loss of balance, seizures, and hallucinations. Once symptoms begin to appear, death usually will occur within two weeks. A person infected with N. fowleri cannot spread the infection to another person, as it is not contageous. From 2009 to 2017, 34 infections were reported in the United States.

Although rarely observed, infection by Naegleria fowleri can occur in animals. Experimentally, mice, guinea pigs, and sheep have been infected, and there have been reports of South American tapirs and cattle contracting PAM. Animal infection is likely quite overlooked.

Treatment 

The core antimicrobial treatment consists of the antifungal drug amphotericin B, which inhibits the pathogen by binding to its cell membrane sterols, thus leading to cell membrane disruption and pathogen death; however, even with this treatment, the fatality rate is greater than 95%.  New treatments are being sought. Miltefosine, an antiparasitic drug that inhibits the pathogen via disrupting its cell survival signal pathway PI3K/Akt/mTOR, has been used in a few cases with mixed results.

A key factor to effective treatment is the speed of diagnosis. PAM is a rare occurrence and is not often considered as a likely diagnosis; therefore, the clinical laboratory’s identification of the microorganism may be the first time an amoebic etiology is considered. The rapid identification can help to avoid delays in diagnosis and therapy. Amoeba cultures and real-time PCR studies for N. fowleri are diagnostic of PAM, but they are not readily available at most institutions and would require being performed at a reference laboratory. The time of presentation of the patient may affect the identification of the microorganism also, as PAM has a variable incubation time, ranging from 1 to 7 days. The clinical signs of PAM are similar to bacterial and viral meningitis, including fever, neck stiffness, and severe headaches. Symptoms can progress to prolonged nausea, vomiting, and even seizures. The disease can progress to acute hemorrhagic necrotizing meningoencephalitis, which can lead to death in as soon as 7–10 days. A variable delay in treatment can be secondary to time intervals in multiple stages of care, including exposure to exhibition of symptoms; arrival for treatment at a health care facility; workup of the diagnosis (initial diagnosis of likely bacterial meningitis); and finally, from diagnosis to initiation of recommended therapy. Successful treatment of PAM is a rare occurrence and can only be attempted after correct diagnosis, which relies on rapid recognition of the microorganism by medical technologists and pathologists. It is critical that medical technologists consistently provide timely CSF evaluation, explore the diagnosis of PAM, and look for amoebae in the setting of meningitis, especially in the summertime.

See also 
 Acanthamoeba – an amoeba that can cause amoebic keratitis and encephalitis in humans
 Balamuthia mandrillaris – an amoeba that is the cause of (often fatal) granulomatous amoebic meningoencephalitis
 Entamoeba histolytica – an amoeba that is the cause of amoebiasis, or amoebic dysentery
 Leptospira – a zoonotic bacteria that causes leptospirosis
 Methicillin-resistant Staphylococcus aureus (MRSA)
 Necrotizing fasciitis – the "flesh-eating disease", caused by certain types of bacteria
 Toxoplasma gondii – cat-carried protozoan that causes the disease toxoplasmosis
 Vibrio vulnificus – warm saltwater infectious bacteria

References

External links 

 Naegleria information site from the Centers for Disease Control and Prevention
 Naegleria from The Tree of Life Web Project

Parasitic excavates
Percolozoa
Species described in 1970
Thermophiles